Lampley is a surname. Notable people with the surname include:

Cal Lampley (1924–2006), American composer and record producer
Jim Lampley (born 1949), American sportscaster, news anchor, film producer and restaurant owner
Lemone Lampley (born 1964), American basketball player 
Sean Lampley (born 1979), American basketball player
Willie Ray Lampley, American far right militiaman